Parvizabad (also Romanized as Parvīzābād) is a village in Chaharduli Rural District, Keshavarz District, Shahin Dezh County, West Azerbaijan Province, Iran. At the 2006 census, its population was 17, in 4 families.

References 

Populated places in Shahin Dezh County